John Wesley Brandes (born April 2, 1964) is a former American football tight end and long snapper in the National Football League for the Indianapolis Colts, Washington Redskins, New York Giants, and the San Francisco 49ers.  He played college football at Cameron University.

1964 births
Living people
American football tight ends
Indianapolis Colts players
Washington Redskins players
New York Giants players
San Francisco 49ers players
Cameron Aggies football players
People from Fort Riley, Kansas
National Football League replacement players